River Dai originates in the southeastern slopes of the Aravalli Range in Rajgarh village, near Nasirabad Tehsil of Ajmer District. It flows southeast for about 40 km and east for about 56 km in Ajmer District and for a short reach through Tonk District, before joining Banas River near Bisalpur village in Tonk District.

Ajmer district
Chambal River
Rivers of Rajasthan
Tonk district
Rivers of India